Gabriella Ferri (18 September 1942 – 3 April 2004) was an Italian singer born in Rome.

Ferri's career began in a Milan nightclub in 1963. By 1965, she had broken into the Rome singing scene by singing popular Roman songs, thereby becoming one icon of Romanesco singing. One of her biggest hits was "Sempre" ("Always"). During her career, she also performed Neapolitan and Latin American pieces. During the 1970s, she starred in several popular TV shows. By the 1990s, however, she had largely left the spotlight.

She died in Corchiano, province of Viterbo, after falling from a third-floor balcony in an apparent suicide. Family members dispute this, saying she may have fallen ill after taking anti-depression medication and lost her balance.

External links
Italian singer Gabriella Ferri, 62 - Associated Press
Gabriella Ferri on Europopmusic.eu (English)

1942 births
2004 deaths
Singers from Rome
20th-century Italian women singers